Human rights in the Maldives, an archipelagic nation of 417,000 people off the coast of the Indian Subcontinent, is a contentious issue. In its 2011 Freedom in the World report, Freedom House declared the Maldives "Partly Free", claiming a reform process which had made headway in 2009 and 2010 had stalled. The United States Bureau of Democracy, Human Rights and Labor claims in their 2012 report on human rights practices in the country that the most significant problems are corruption, lack of religious freedom, and abuse and unequal treatment of women.

History and political situation

The Maldives gained independence from the United Kingdom in 1965.  The nation began its independent existence as a sultanate, but a 1968 referendum approved a constitution establishing the nation as a republic.  Ibrahim Nasir, Prime Minister under the sultanate, became President and held office from 1968 to 1978. He was succeeded by Maumoon Abdul Gayoom, who was elected President in 1978 and re-elected in 1983, 1988, 1993, 1998, and 2003. At the end of his presidency in 2008, he was the longest serving leader in Asia.  The national government generally exercised tight control over its people during this time.

The following chart shows the Maldives' ratings since 1972 in the Freedom in the World reports, published annually by Freedom House. A rating of 1 is "free"; 7, "not free".

After a coup attempt by supporters of Nasir was uncovered in 1980, the government arrested those thought to be involved, and their wives and children were placed under house arrest. At least three people were sentenced for association with the former president, and at least one – Mohamed Ismail Manniku Sikku, the former Director of Civil Aviation – was banished to an uninhabited atoll for "ten years and a day".

The president considered responsible for the human rights gains in 2009–2010, Mohamed Nasheed, resigned after weeks of protests led by police and was placed under house arrest. He was replaced by Mohammed Waheed Hassan, the former head of UNICEF Afghanistan.

Current issues (2008–)

Freedom of religion

The constitution states that all Maldivians must be Sunni Muslim. On 14 December 2011 a group of ten men attacked peaceful demonstrators in Malé calling for religious tolerance. Sufi Ismail Khilath Rasheed sustained a skull fracture and was later arrested as his calls for tolerance were unconstitutional. No effort was made to arrest the attackers. On 5 June 2012, Rasheed was stabbed in the neck. Reporters Without Borders stated that it appeared that he had been deliberately targeted for his journalism. A minister of the Maldivian government condemned the attack, but also added "Hilath must have known that he had become a target of a few extremists ... We are not a secular country. When you talk about religion there will always be a few people who do not agree."

The Ministry of Islamic Affairs is the only body which grants licenses to imams, and sermons must be approved. They also control religious education and have the power to deport any non-Muslim. Non-Muslim foreigners must practice their religion in private.

Freedom of speech
Defamation and Speech "contrary to the tenets of Islam" is illegal.

Media and censorship

2008 saw the Maldives' first private television channels. In August 2010 private channel Villa TV was attacked, and journalists were attacked by police for covering a political protest in October 2010. Opposition websites can be accessed in the country, but some Christian missionary websites have been blocked by the Ministry of Islamic Affairs.

On 1 May 2011 two journalists – one from Haveeru Daily and one from Sun FM – were arrested for covering a protest. They were released after 24 hours.

Freedom of assembly
The constitution protects "freedom of peaceful assembly without prior permission of the State", and the U.S. State Department claims these rights are generally upheld.

In July 2020, Human Rights Watch denounced the Maldivian government's recent enforcement of laws restricting protests and other gatherings, saying that the government's actions constituted a violation of fundamental rights. The government's decision to enforce the laws came in the wake of multiple protests staged during the month of July.

Legal system

Most judges have no formal legal training and are given much leeway in their interpretations of Muslim law.

The Maldives National Defence Force holds human rights courses.

Allegations of arbitrary arrests and torture
Flogging is a frequently imposed punishment, and carried out behind the court buildings. 96 people – over 80% of them women –  were sentenced to this mode of punishment in 2010.

Arbitrary arrest and detention is illegal.

At least four members of parliament were arrested in July 2010. They claimed the detentions were carried out to force them to comply with political demands. They were released soon after. On 16 August 2011 one of these MPs, Abdullah Yameen, was granted compensation.

Minority and women's rights

Parliament contains five female members, and women have a 98% literacy rate.

In 2011 four police officers were discharged from the force, but not formally charged, for driving a woman around Malé, forcing her to strip her clothes, sexually and physically abusing her, and throwing her on the street.

As the state partially practices Sharia law in some matters, homosexuality is illegal. The punishment for men is nine months to one year imprisonment, or 10 to 30 lashes. The punishment for women is nine months to one year of house arrest.

See also

Human trafficking in the Maldives

Notes 
1.Note that the "Year" signifies the "Year covered". Therefore the information for the year marked 2008 is from the report published in 2009, and so on.
2.As of 1 January.
3.The 1982 report covers 1981 and the first half of 1982, and the following 1984 report covers the second half of 1982 and the whole of 1983. In the interest of simplicity, these two aberrant "year and a half" reports have been split into three year-long reports through interpolation.

References

External links
Reports
Country Report on Human Rights Practices for 2011 by the United States Department of State
2012 Human rights report  by Amnesty International (also available in Arabic , French , and Spanish )
 Freedom in the World 2011 Report , by Freedom House
International organizations
Maldives  at Amnesty International (also available in Arabic , French , and Spanish )
Maldives at Human Rights Watch
Maldives at FIDH
Maldives at the Office of the United Nations High Commissioner for Human Rights (OHCHR)
Maldives  at UNICEF
Maldives at the International Freedom of Expression Exchange (IFEX)
National organizations
Human Rights Commission of the Maldives